Boris Solotareff (October 23, 1889 – July 1966) was a Russian painter. He was active in Munich, Switzerland, and France, but spent the majority of his career in New York where he became a naturalized American citizen in 1949. Solotareff made use of a variety of styles; according to  the Benezit Dictionary of Artists, his "work was in the mainstream of Eastern European Expressionism, with influences of Art Deco from the time when he lived in Paris." Solotareff's paintings have been exhibited widely, including the "Cinquantenaire Du Symbolisme" exhibition at the Bibliothèque Nationale (1936), the Vendome Galleries (New York, 1938), and the "Exhibition of oils and water colors" at the Charles Barzansky Galleries from October 1–20, 1940.

Biography
Born in Bender, in the Bessarabia Governorate of the Russian Empire, Solotareff began his art studies at the Russian art school in Odessa, Ukraine. This went on until he turned 18 in 1907 when the artist moved to Munich, Germany enrolling at the Akademie der Bildenden Künste. After seven years in Munich, Solotareff moved to Lausanne, Switzerland. In the six years he stayed there his style underwent a change from the German Impressionist style that inspired his Munich paintings to one more influenced by Fauvism. In describing two of Solotareff's paintings from that period, "Meadow of Wild Flowers" and "Farm in Lausanne", James Gardner wrote "The paint has been thickly applied in elongated, energetic jabs that sway and pulsate in every direction like schools of fish. But only the surface seems agitated. Farther down there is the deep and reassuring calm that seems best to typify the Russian artist's sanguine disposition".

The year 1920 found Solotareff traveling in France and Italy before settling in Paris where, under the influence of Pablo Picasso and Marie Laurencin, he began to paint in a more neo-classical style. While in Paris, Solotareff was a member of the Salon des Indépendants. In 1937, the artist moved to New York, where he lived and painted for the rest of his life. He worked as a stage designer in the avant-garde Yiddish theater ARTEF ( — Arbeter Teater Farband).

References

Sources
 Charles Barzansky Galleries. (1940). Exhibition of oils and water colors. New York: Charles Barzansky Galleries. OCLC 82503654
 Solotareff, B., Gardner, J., & Borghi & Co. (1990). Boris Solotareff, 1889-1966: A retrospective : September 20-October 20, 1990. New York, NY: Borghi & Co. OCLC 23532316
 "SOLOTAREFF, Boris." Benezit Dictionary of Artists. In Oxford Art Online.

External links
 Works by Boris Solotareff at the Metropolitan Museum of Art (NY)
 "Portrait of a Girl" at the Fogg Museum (Harvard)
 Works by Boris Solotareff at the Borghi Fine Art Gallery.

1889 births
1966 deaths
People from Bender, Moldova
People from Bendersky Uyezd
Bessarabian Jews
Painters from the Russian Empire
Expatriates from the Russian Empire in Germany
Emigrants from the Russian Empire to France
French emigrants to the United States
Jewish painters
Modern painters
People from Lausanne
20th-century Russian male artists